Austin Friars is a coeducational private day school located in Carlisle, England. The Senior School provides secondary education for 350 boys and girls aged 11–18. There are 150 children aged 4–11 in the Junior School and the Nursery has places for 16 children aged 3–4. Founded by the Augustinian friars in 1951, it is one of the network of Augustinian schools in other parts of the world and welcomes pupils of all denominations.

History
At the request of the Diocese of Lancaster, the Order of Saint Augustine founded Austin Friars School, a day and boarding grammar school, to provide a Catholic education for boys in Cumbria and the city of Carlisle. The property was originally used by the Sisters of the Sacred Heart who had founded a school there before leaving for Newcastle upon Tyne in 1903 (and subsequently establishing Sacred Heart Catholic High School) and the Poor Sisters of Nazareth who ran an orphanage. It was then acquired by the Augustinians in 1951 and has been occupied by the school ever since. Girls were admitted in 1986. Boarding ceased in 1998 due to declining interest.

St Monica's, a coeducational junior school, was founded by parents as an independent charity when St Gabriel's closed. It was relocated to the same site as Austin Friars in 1985.

The two schools legally merged in 2003 and were renamed Austin Friars St Monica's School. It became a trust after the last Augustinian priest, Father Bernard Rolls, who had himself been a pupil at the school, left for another assignment in 2005. Since then, the school has been operated entirely by lay staff and board of governors. It maintains its Catholic ethos and religious character.

In September 2015, the School was renamed as 'Austin Friars'.

Houses
The school has three houses: Clare, Lincoln and Stafford. Determination of the house a pupil belongs to is random apart from when a relative (most usually a sibling) has previously belonged to a house. Each house has associated House Captains (usually one boy and one girl), along with a Head Boy and Head Girl (School Captains) and their Deputies that can be chosen from any house. Prefects are expected to perform various duties such as monitoring hallways etc. There is a voting system where each form group will receive a list of candidates to be house captain or school captain.

Each year the School produces a musical or play and termly concerts are held in the School's Chapel. There are regular visits to theatres, concerts and galleries and school visits to the continent. The School Charities Committee also produces a very successful Fashion Show with proceeds supporting the work of Eden Valley Hospice (Jigsaw Children's Hospice) and Hospice at Home (Carlisle & North Lakeland).  The school donates at least £10000 to local, national and international charities each year.

References

External links
 Official website
 Profile on the Independent Schools Council website
 Augustinian Province of England and Scotland

Private schools in Cumbria
Schools in Carlisle, Cumbria
Augustinian schools
Educational institutions established in 1951
Roman Catholic private schools in the Diocese of Lancaster
1951 establishments in England